Grigory Lipmanovich Sokolov (born April 18, 1950) is a Russian pianist naturalized Spanish. He is among the most esteemed of living pianists, his repertoire spanning composers from the Baroque period such as Bach, Couperin or Rameau up to Schoenberg and Arapov. He regularly tours Europe (excluding the UK) and resides in Italy.

Biography 
Sokolov was born in Leningrad, now Saint Petersburg, to Jewish father Lipman Girshevich Sokolov and Russian mother Galina Nikolayevna Zelenetskaya. He began studying the piano at the age of five and entered the Leningrad Conservatory's special school for children at the age of seven to study with Leah Zelikhman. After graduating from the children's school, he continued studying at the Conservatory with Moisey Khalfin. At 12, he gave his first major recital in Moscow, in a concert of works by Bach, Beethoven, Schumann, Chopin, Mendelssohn, Rachmaninoff, Scriabin, Liszt, Debussy and Shostakovich at the Philharmonic Society. At age 16, he came to international attention when he was awarded the gold medal in the 1966 International Tchaikovsky Piano Competition, making him the youngest ever winner. It seems this may have been a surprising result: "16-year old Grisha Sokolov, who finally became the winner of that competition, was not taken seriously by anyone at that time."

Despite his Tchaikovsky Competition success, Sokolov's international career began to develop only towards the end of the 1980s. Some have speculated that his not defecting and the limited travelling allowed under the Soviet regime were to blame. This is contradicted by the fact that Sokolov gave U.S. tours in 1969, 1971, 1975 and 1979, as well as numerous recitals elsewhere in the world such as Finland and Japan. "Sokolov's life as a touring soloist is quite overcrowded. He tours a great deal in both his motherland and abroad."
The 1980s seem to have posed something of a stumbling block to Sokolov's career in the U.S. "In the beginning, I played a lot of single concerts in America, in 1969, '71 and, I think, 1975. After that there was a break in relationships between the U.S. and the Soviet Union—they were disconnected by the Afghanistan war. A scheduled tour in the U.S. was cancelled in 1980. Then all cultural agreements between the two countries were cancelled."  
In addition, during the breakup of the former Soviet Union, Sokolov played no concerts outside Russia.

 He is now a well-known figure in concert halls around Europe, but much less so in the U.S. Sokolov has released relatively few recordings to date, and released none for the 20 years between 1995 and 2015. But in 2014 he signed a contract with Deutsche Grammophon to release recordings of some of his live performances, and in 2015 he released a 2-CD live Salzburg recital featuring two sonatas by Mozart, Chopin's cycle of 24 Preludes, and encore pieces by Scriabin, Chopin, Rameau and Bach.

In August 2022, the Spanish government granted him Spanish nationality.

Public statements

In March 2009, Sokolov cancelled a planned concert in London because of British visa requirements demanding that all non-E.U. workers provide fingerprints and eye prints with every visa application (he also cancelled his 2008 concert on seemingly similar grounds). Sokolov protested that such requirements had echoes of Soviet oppression.

After British music critic Norman Lebrecht received the Cremona Music Award 2014, Sokolov, upon learning of his being awarded the Cremona Music Award 2015, refused to accept the honour, making this statement on his website: "According to my ideas about elementary decency, it is shame to be in the same award-winners list with Lebrecht." Sokolov's statement appeared to refer to personal remarks Lebrecht had made about Sokolov's family.

Influences 
Sokolov cited the following pianists as having inspired him in his years of studies:
"Of those whom I heard on the stage I'd like to name first of all Emil Gilels. Judging by the records, it was Rachmaninoff, Sofronitsky, Glenn Gould, Solomon [and] Lipatti. As to aesthetics, I feel most close to Anton Rubinstein."

Repertoire 

The 14 CDs (2 of Bach, 2 of Beethoven, 2 of Schubert, 2 of Chopin, 1 of Brahms, and 1 of Scriabin, Rachmaninoff and Prokofiev—all recorded by the label Opus 111, plus a 2-CD 2008 recital set released in 2015 and another 2-CD set taken from recitals in 2013 and released in 2016, both issued by DG on CD and LP) and 1 DVD (a live recital in Paris) that are currently (2015) available for Sokolov constitute a snapshot of the repertoire that Sokolov has so far performed. There is now a second (DG) DVD, of a concert (including the 'Hammerklavier' Sonata) recorded in the Berlin Philharmonie on June 5, 2013. This DVD was directed by Bruno Monsaingeon. A more extensive repertoire listing is as follows:

Arapov
Concerto for violin, piano and percussion
Etude-Scherzo
Sonatas No. 1, 2 & 5
Bach
The Art of Fugue
English Suite No.2
Fantasy & Fugue in A minor, BWV 904
French Suite No.3
Goldberg Variations
Italian Concerto in F major, BWV 971
Overture in the French Style, BWV 831
Partitas Nos. 1, 2, 4 & 6
Sonata "Hortus Musicus" by Johann Adam Reincken BWV965
Toccata in E minor, BWV 914
Well-Tempered Clavier Book I
Well-Tempered Clavier Book II
Bach-Brahms: Chaconne for the left-hand BWV1004
Bach-Busoni: "Ich ruf zu dir, Herr Jesus Christ" BWV639
Bach-Busoni: "Nun freut euch, lieben Christen g’mein" BWV734
Bach-Siloti: Prelude in B minor
Beethoven
Sonatas No. 2, 3, 4, 7, 9–11, 13–17 & 27–32
Diabelli Variations
Concertos No. 1 & 5
Rondos Op.51 & Op.129
Bagatelles Op.119
Variations Op.35 "Eroica"
Brahms
Concertos Nos. 1 & 2
Sonata No.1 in C major, Op.1
Sonata No.3 in F minor, Op.5
4 Ballades Op.10
Variations on a Theme by Handel Op. 24
2 Rhapsodies Op.79
7 Fantasies Op.116
3 Intermezzi Op.117
6 Klavierstücke Op.118
4 Klavierstücke Op.119
Byrd
Pavan & Galliard MB52
Alman MB11
Prelude MB12
Clarifica me Pater (II) MB48
Qui Passe MB19
March before the Battle MB93
Battle MB94
Galliard for Victory MB95
Carvalho-Sokolov Toccata and Andante in G
Chopin
Ballade No.4 in F minor, Op.52
Concertos Nos. 1 & 2
Etude Op.10 No.8
Etudes Op.25
Fantasie-Impromptu Op.66
Fantasy Op.49
Impromptus Op.29, Op.36 & Op.51
Mazurkas Op.7 No.2, Op.17 No.4, Op.30 Nos. 1–4, Op.33 No.4, Op.50 Nos. 1–3, Op.63 Nos. 1–3, Op.67 No.2, Op.68 Nos. 2–4, Op.posth
Nocturnes Op.15 No.1, Op.27 No.1, Op.32 Nos. 1 & 2, Op.48 Nos. 1 & 2, Op.62 Nos. 1 & 2, Op.72, Op. posth
Polonaise-Fantasie Op.61
Polonaises Op.26 No. 1 & 2, Op.40 No.2, Op.44, Op.53, Op. posth.
Preludes Op.28
Sonatas Nos. 2 & 3
Waltz No.17 Op.posth
Couperin
Le Tic-Toc-Choc ou les Maillotins
Pièces de clavecin Book III Ordre XIII & Ordre XVIII
Debussy
Des pas sur la neige (from Preludes, Book I, No.6)
Canope (from Preludes, Book II, No.10)
Franck
Prelude, Chorale & Fugue
Froberger
Toccata FbWV101
Canzon FbWV301
Fantasia FbWV201
Ricercar FbWV411
Capriccio FbWV508
Partita FbWV610
Griboyedov
Waltz No.2 in E minor
Haydn
Piano Sonatas Hob XVI: 23, 32, 34, 36, 37 & 44
Komitas
Six Dances
Liszt
La Campanella
Rhapsodie espagnole
Mozart
Concertos Nos. 21, 23 & 24
Adagio K.540
Prelude (Fantasie) and Fugue K.394
Rondo K.511
Sonatas K.280, K.310, K.331, K.332, K.333, K.457, & K.545
Fantasy K.475
Prokofiev
Concerto No.1
Sonatas Nos. 3, 7 & 8
Purcell
A Ground in Gamut, Z.645
A New Irish Tune, Z.646
A New Scotch Tune, Z.655
A Trumpet Tune, ZT.678
Chaconne in G minor, ZT.680
Rondo in D minor, ZT.684
Suite No.2 in G minor Z.661
Suite No.4 in A minor, Z.663
Suite No.7 in D minor, Z.668
Rachmaninov
Concertos Nos. 2 & 3
Preludes Op.2 No.3, Op.23, Op.32 No.5 & No.12
Rameau
Suite in D de Pièces de clavecin (1724) — in his repertory in 2012
Suite in G/g de Pièces de clavecin (1726) — in his repertory before 2012
"Le rappel des oiseaux" & "Tambourin" from Suite in E minor (1724)
"L’indiscrète" from the Pièces de clavecin
Ravel
Gaspard de la nuit
Le Tombeau de Couperin
Oiseaux tristes (from Miroirs)
Prélude
Sonatine
Saint-Saëns
Concerto No. 2
Schoenberg
Two Pieces Op.33
Schubert
Allegretto D.915
Hungarian Melody D.817
Impromptus D.899 No. 1–4, D.935 No. 1-4
Klavierstücke D.946 No. 1–3
Moment Musicaux D.780
Sonatas D.537, D.664, D.784, D.850, D.894, D.958, D.959 & D.960
Waltz in G major, D.844
Wanderer Fantasy
Schumann
Carnaval Op.9
Sonata No.1 in F-sharp minor, Op.11
Sonata No.2 in G minor, Op.22
Sonata No.3 in F minor, Op.14
Kreisleriana Op.16
Fantasie Op.17
Arabesque Op.18
Humoresque Op.20
Bunte Blätter, Op. 99
Noveletten Op.21 Nos. 2, 7 & 8
Presto passionato Op.22a
4 Klavierstücke (Scherzo, Gigue, Romance and Fughette) Op.32
Variations in E-flat on an Original Theme, WoO 24, "Geister Variations"
Scriabin
Caresse dansée Op.57 No.2
Désir Op.57 No.1
Énigme Op.52 No.2
Etudes Op.2 No.1, Op.8, Op.42 Nos. 4 & 5
Feuillet d’album Op.45 No.1
Poème fantastique Op.45 No.2
Poèmes Op.32 No.2, Op.69 Nos. 1 & 2
Prelude & Nocturne for Left Hand Op.9
Preludes Op.11 No.4, Op.33 Nos. 1–4, Op.45 No.3, Op.49 No.2 & Op.51 No.2
Sonatas Nos. 1, 3, 4, 9 & 10
Vers la flamme Op.72
Seixas-Sokolov Toccatas in D & C
Stravinsky
Trois mouvements de Petrouchka
Tchaikovsky
Concerto No.1

References

Citations

Sources

Books

Online

External links
Grigory Sokolov General Management
Site dedicated to Grigory Sokolov

Russian classical pianists
Male classical pianists
Jewish classical pianists
1950 births
Living people
Saint Petersburg Conservatory alumni
Prize-winners of the International Tchaikovsky Competition
20th-century classical pianists
21st-century classical pianists